John Laurence Hardy  (born 14 September 1942) is an Australian aviator and businessman who founded the aviation company Airnorth in 1978 and Hardy Aviation in 1991. He was  Administrator of the Northern Territory from November 2014 until October 2017.

Hardy was born at Midland Junction in Perth, Western Australia, and moved to Broken Hill at the age of six, where his father, Evan, was chief metallurgist at North Broken Hill mine. He was schooled at Broken Hill High School.

He moved to the Northern Territory in 1971 to work as a pilot in the South Australian and Territory Air Services, where he flew supplies from Darwin to the Indonesian island of Ceram for the American oil giant Gulf and Western's oil field there. When aviation work was not available, Hardy worked as a radiographer at Darwin Hospital in Larrakeyah.

On 10 November 2014, Hardy was sworn in as Administrator of the Northern Territory by Governor-General Sir Peter Cosgrove.

Honours
In 2012 Hardy was awarded the Medal of the Order of Australia (OAM) for service to aviation in the Northern Territory, and to the community; and in 2017 he was appointed an Officer of the Order of Australia for distinguished service to the people of the Northern Territory, and as a patron and supporter of a range of aviation, health, emergency service and charitable organisations.

References

1942 births
Living people
Administrators of the Northern Territory
Australian aviators
Australian businesspeople
Officers of the Order of Australia
Recipients of the Medal of the Order of Australia
People from Perth, Western Australia